National Highway 22 (NH 22) is a National Highway in India. This highway runs from Sonbarsa in Bihar to Chandwa in Jharkhand.

Route

Bihar 

Sonbarsa (Indo/Nepal Border), Sitamarhi, Muzaffarpur, Hajipur, Patna, Punpun, Gaya, Bodh Gaya, Dobhi - Jharkhand border.

Jharkhand 
Chandwa - Balumath - Chatra - Jori - Hunterganj - Bihar Border

References

National highways in India
National Highways in Bihar
National Highways in Jharkhand